Antihistamines are drugs which treat allergic rhinitis, common cold, influenza, and other allergies.  Typically, people take antihistamines as an inexpensive, generic (not patented) drug that can be bought without a prescription and provides relief from nasal congestion, sneezing, or hives caused by pollen, dust mites, or animal allergy with few side effects. Antihistamines are usually for short-term treatment. Chronic allergies increase the risk of health problems which antihistamines might not treat, including asthma, sinusitis, and lower respiratory tract infection. Consultation of a medical professional is recommended for those who intend to take antihistamines for longer-term use.

Although people typically use the word "antihistamine" to describe drugs for treating allergies, doctors and scientists use the term to describe a class of drug that opposes the activity of histamine receptors in the body. In this sense of the word, antihistamines are subclassified according to the histamine receptor that they act upon. The two largest classes of antihistamines are H1-antihistamines and H2-antihistamines.

H1-antihistamines work by binding to histamine H1 receptors in mast cells, smooth muscle, and endothelium in the body as well as in the tuberomammillary nucleus in the brain. Antihistamines that target the histamine H1-receptor are used to treat allergic reactions in the nose (e.g., itching, runny nose, and sneezing). In addition, they may be used to treat insomnia, motion sickness, or vertigo caused by problems with the inner ear. H2-antihistamines bind to histamine H2 receptors in the upper gastrointestinal tract, primarily in the stomach. Antihistamines that target the histamine H2-receptor are used to treat gastric acid conditions (e.g., peptic ulcers and acid reflux). Other antihistamines also target H3 receptors and H4 receptors.

Histamine receptors exhibit constitutive activity, so antihistamines can function as either a neutral receptor antagonist or an inverse agonist at histamine receptors. Only a few currently marketed H1-antihistamines are known to function as inverse agonists.

Medical uses 
Histamine makes blood vessels more permeable (vascular permeability), causing fluid to escape from capillaries into tissues, which leads to the classic symptoms of an allergic reaction — a runny nose and watery eyes.  Histamine also promotes angiogenesis.

Antihistamines suppress the histamine-induced wheal response (swelling) and flare response (vasodilation) by blocking the binding of histamine to its receptors or reducing histamine receptor activity on nerves, vascular smooth muscle, glandular cells, endothelium, and mast cells. Antihistamines can also help correct Eustachian Tube dysfunction, thereby helping correct problems such as muffled hearing, fullness in the ear and even tinnitus.

Itching, sneezing, and inflammatory responses are suppressed by antihistamines that act on H1-receptors. In 2014, antihistamines such as desloratadine were found to be effective to complement standardized treatment of acne due to their anti-inflammatory properties and their ability to suppress sebum production.

Types

H1-antihistamines 

H1-antihistamines refer to compounds that inhibit the activity of the H1 receptor. Since the H1 receptor exhibits constitutive activity, H1-antihistamines can be either neutral receptor antagonists or inverse agonists.  Normally, histamine binds to the H1 receptor and heightens the receptor's activity; the receptor antagonists work by binding to the receptor and blocking the activation of the receptor by histamine; by comparison, the inverse agonists bind to the receptor and both block the binding of histamine, and reduce its constitutive activity, an effect which is opposite to histamine's. Most antihistamines are inverse agonists at the H1 receptor, but it was previously thought that they were antagonists.

Clinically, H1-antihistamines are used to treat allergic reactions and mast cell-related disorders. Sedation is a common side effect of H1-antihistamines that readily cross the blood–brain barrier; some of these drugs, such as diphenhydramine and doxylamine, may therefore be used to treat insomnia. H1-antihistamines can also reduce inflammation, since the expression of NF-κB, the transcription factor the regulates inflammatory processes, is promoted by both the receptor's constitutive activity and agonist (i.e., histamine) binding at the H1 receptor.

A combination of these effects, and in some cases metabolic ones as well, lead to most first-generation antihistamines having analgesic-sparing (potentiating) effects on opioid analgesics and to some extent with non-opioid ones as well.  The most common antihistamines utilized for this purpose include hydroxyzine, promethazine (enzyme induction especially helps with codeine and similar prodrug opioids), phenyltoloxamine, orphenadrine, and tripelennamine; some may also have intrinsic analgesic properties of their own, orphenadrine being an example.

Second-generation antihistamines cross the blood–brain barrier to a much lesser extent than the first-generation antihistamines. They minimize sedatory effects due to their focused effect on peripheral histamine receptors. However, upon high doses second-generation antihistamines will begin to act on the central nervous system and thus can induce drowsiness when ingested in higher quantity. Additionally, some second-generation antihistamines, notably cetirizine, can interact with CNS psychoactive drugs such as bupropion and benzodiazepines.

H1 antagonists/inverse agonists 
 Acrivastine
 Alimemazine (a phenothiazine used as antipruritic, antiemetic and sedative)
 Amitriptyline (tricyclic antidepressant)
 Amoxapine (tricyclic antidepressant)
 Aripiprazole (atypical antipsychotic, trade name: Abilify)
 Azelastine
 Bilastine
 Bromodiphenhydramine (Bromazine)
 Brompheniramine
 Buclizine
 Carbinoxamine
 Cetirizine (Zyrtec)
 Chlophedianol (Clofedanol)
 Chlorodiphenhydramine
 Chlorpheniramine
 Chlorpromazine (low-potency typical antipsychotic, also used as an antiemetic)
 Chlorprothixene (low-potency typical antipsychotic, trade name: Truxal)
 Chloropyramine (first generation antihistamine marketed in Eastern Europe)
 Cinnarizine (also used for motion sickness and vertigo)
 Clemastine
 Clomipramine (tricyclic antidepressant)
 Clozapine (atypical antipsychotic; trade name: Clozaril)
 Cyclizine
 Cyproheptadine
 Desloratadine
 Dexbrompheniramine
 Dexchlorpheniramine
 Dimenhydrinate (used as an antiemetic and for motion sickness)
 Dimetindene
 Diphenhydramine (Benadryl)
 Dosulepin (tricyclic antidepressant)
 Doxepin (tricyclic antidepressant)
 Doxylamine (most commonly used as an over-the-counter drug sedative)
 Ebastine
 Embramine
 Fexofenadine (Allegra/Telfast)
 Fluoxetine
 Hydroxyzine (also used as an anxiolytic and for motion sickness; trade names: Atarax, Vistaril)
 Imipramine (tricyclic antidepressant)
 Ketotifen
 Levocabastine (Livostin/Livocab)
 Levocetirizine (Xyzal)
 Levomepromazine (low-potency typical antipsychotic)
 Loratadine (Claritin)
 Maprotiline (tetracyclic antidepressant)
 Meclizine (most commonly used as an antiemetic)
 Mianserin (tetracyclic antidepressant)
 Mirtazapine (tetracyclic antidepressant, also has antiemetic and appetite-stimulating effects; trade name: Remeron)
 Olanzapine (atypical antipsychotic; trade name: Zyprexa)
 Olopatadine (used locally)
 Orphenadrine (a close relative of diphenhydramine used mainly as a skeletal muscle relaxant and anti-Parkinsons agent)
 Periciazine (low-potency typical antipsychotic)
 Phenindamine
 Pheniramine
 Phenyltoloxamine
 Promethazine (Phenergan)
 Pyrilamine (crosses the blood–brain barrier; produces drowsiness)
 Quetiapine (atypical antipsychotic; trade name: Seroquel)
 Rupatadine (Alergoliber)
 Setastine (Loderix)
 Setiptiline (or teciptiline, a tetracyclic antidepressant, trade name: Tecipul)
 Trazodone (SARI antidepressant/anxiolytic/hypnotic with mild H1 blockade action) 
 Tripelennamine
 Triprolidine

H2-antihistamines 

H2-antihistamines, like H1-antihistamines, exist as inverse agonists and neutral antagonists. They act on H2 histamine receptors found mainly in the parietal cells of the gastric mucosa, which are part of the endogenous signaling pathway for gastric acid secretion. Normally, histamine acts on H2 to stimulate acid secretion; drugs that inhibit H2 signaling thus reduce the secretion of gastric acid.

H2-antihistamines are among first-line therapy to treat gastrointestinal conditions including peptic ulcers and gastroesophageal reflux disease.  Some formulations are available over the counter. Most side effects are due to cross-reactivity with unintended receptors. Cimetidine, for example, is notorious for antagonizing androgenic testosterone and DHT receptors at high doses.

Examples include:
Cimetidine
Famotidine
Lafutidine
Nizatidine
Ranitidine
Roxatidine
Tiotidine

H3-antihistamines 

An H3-antihistamine is a classification of drugs used to inhibit the action of histamine at the H3 receptor. H3 receptors are primarily found in the brain and are inhibitory autoreceptors located on histaminergic nerve terminals, which modulate the release of histamine. Histamine release in the brain triggers secondary release of excitatory neurotransmitters such as glutamate and acetylcholine via stimulation of H1 receptors in the cerebral cortex. Consequently, unlike the H1-antihistamines which are sedating, H3-antihistamines have stimulant and cognition-modulating effects.

Examples of selective H3-antihistamines include:
Clobenpropit 
ABT-239 
Ciproxifan 
Conessine
A-349,821.
 Thioperamide

H4-antihistamines 
H4-antihistamines inhibit the activity of the H4 receptor.
Examples:
 Thioperamide
 JNJ 7777120
 VUF-6002

Atypical antihistamines

Histidine decarboxylase inhibitors 
Inhibit the action of histidine decarboxylase:
 Tritoqualine 
 Catechin

Mast cell stabilizers 

Mast cell stabilizers are drugs which prevent mast cell degranulation.
 cromolyn sodium
 Nedocromil
 β-agonists

History 
The first H1 receptor antagonists were discovered in the 1930s and these drugs were marketed in the 1940s. Piperoxan was discovered in 1933 and was the first compound with antihistamine effects to be identified. However, piperoxan and its analogues were too toxic to be used in humans. Phenbenzamine (Antergan) was the first clinically useful antihistamine and was introduced for medical use in 1942. Subsequently, many other antihistamines were developed and marketed. Diphenhydramine (Benadryl) was synthesized in 1943, tripelennamine (Pyribenzamine) was patented in 1946, and promethazine (Phenergan) was synthesized in 1947 and launched in 1949. By 1950, at least 20 different antihistamines had been marketed. Chlorphenamine (Piriton), a less sedating antihistamine, was synthesized in 1951, and hydroxyzine (Atarax, Vistaril), an antihistamine used specifically as a sedative and tranquilizer, was developed in 1956. The first non-sedating antihistamine was terfenadine (Seldane) and was developed in 1973. Subsequently, other non-sedating antihistamines like loratadine (Claritin), cetirizine (Zyrtec), and fexofenadine (Allegra) were developed and introduced.

The introduction of the first-generation antihistamines marked the beginning of medical treatment of nasal allergies. Research into these drugs led to the discovery that they were H1 receptor antagonists and also to the development of H2 receptor antagonists, where H1-antihistamines affected the nose and the H2-antihistamines affected the stomach. This history has led to contemporary research into drugs which are H3 receptor antagonists and which affect the H4 receptor antagonists. Currently most people who use an H1 receptor antagonist to treat allergies use a second- or third-generation drug.

Society and culture 
The United States government removed two second generation antihistamines, terfenadine and astemizole, from the market based on evidence that they could cause heart problems.

Research 
Not much published research exists which compares the efficacy and safety of the various antihistamines available. The research which does exist is mostly short-term studies or studies which look at too few people to make general assumptions. Another gap in the research is in information reporting the health effects for individuals with long-term allergies who take antihistamines for a long period of time. Newer antihistamines have been demonstrated to be effective in treating hives. However, there is no research comparing the relative efficacy of these drugs.

Special populations 
In 2020, the UK National Health Service wrote that "[m]ost people can safely take antihistamines" but that "[s]ome antihistamines may not be suitable" for young children, the pregnant or breastfeeding, for those taking other medicines, or people with conditions "such as heart disease, liver disease, kidney disease or epilepsy".

Most studies of antihistamines reported on people who are younger, so the effects on people over age 65 are not as well understood. Older people are more likely to experience drowsiness from antihistamine use than younger people. Continuous and/or cumulative use of anticholinergic medications, including first-generation antihistamines, is associated with higher risk for cognitive decline and dementia in older people.

Also, most of the research has been on caucasians and other ethnic groups are not as represented in the research. The evidence does not report how antihistamines affect women differently than men. Different studies have reported on antihistamine use in children, with various studies finding evidence that certain antihistamines could be used by children 2 years of age, and other drugs being safer for younger or older children.

Potential uses studied 
Research regarding the effects of commonly used medications upon certain cancer therapies has suggested that when consumed in conjunction with immune checkpoint inhibitors some may influence the response of subjects to that particular treatment whose T-cell functions were failing in anti-tumor activity. Upon study of records in mouse studies associated with 40 common medications ranging from antibiotics, antihistamines, aspirin, and hydrocortisone, that for subjects with melanoma and lung cancers, fexofenadine, one of three medications,  along with loratadine, and cetirizine, that target histamine receptor H1 (HRH1), demonstrated significantly higher survival rates and had experienced restored T-cell anti-tumor activity, ultimately inhibiting tumor growth in the subject animals. Such results encourage further study in order to see whether results in humans is similar in combating resistance to immunotherapy.

See also 
 Antileukotriene
 Immunotherapy

References

External links 
 
 Antihistamine information at Allergy UK

 
Vasoconstrictors